Richard Hardy (died 1607), of Southampton, was an English politician.

He was a Member (MP) of the Parliament of England for Newport, Isle of Wight in 1586 and 1589.

References

16th-century births
1607 deaths
Politicians from Southampton
English MPs 1586–1587
English MPs 1589